Sri Ramanagara is a village and Grama panchayat in Gangavathi taluk of Koppal district, Karnataka, India.

References

Koppal district